A.C. Frieden, (1966, Dakar, Senegal) is an author of thrillers and mysteries, including the acclaimed Jonathan Brooks series.

Biography 

Frieden spent most of his youth abroad. After leaving his birthplace in West Africa, he spent several years in Asia and Europe before emigrating with his parents to the southern United States in the early 1980s. In the mid-1980s, he returned to his native Switzerland to serve in the Swiss Army, where he trained as a marksman. He later came back to the U.S. to complete undergraduate and graduate studies.

As a result of his international experiences, Frieden visited dozens of countries, and what began as short stories, diaries and poems, many written during his travels, soon emerged as ingredients for future novels. Mysteries and thrillers soon became his passion. His first manuscript, Canvas Sunsets Never Fade, a mystery based on nuclear proliferation in the Middle East, was written in 2000 and published in 2004. His second novel Tranquility Denied is set in post-Cold War Moscow, Stockholm and Southern Louisiana, and is the first in a series featuring hotshot maritime lawyer Jonathan Brooks. The book was launched in Russia and in the U.S. in late 2006, followed by the sequel, The Serpent's Game, in 2013, and The Pyongyang Option in March, 2019.  His publishers, Down & Out Books and Avendia Publishing, recently announced the upcoming release of next Jonathan Brooks thriller, Letter From Istanbul.

For his novels, Frieden has extensively researched the most challenging conflicts of the Cold War, including the Tito–Stalin split, the French Indochina War, the Korean War, the United States intervention in Chile, the Invasion of Panama, CIA activities in Bolivia, and the August Coup in the former Soviet Union.  He’s also researched key events in the changing post-Cold War era, such as the sinking of the K-141 Kursk, the 1999 NATO bombing of Yugoslavia, and the 2011 Libyan civil war. His on-site research has included interviewing key political figures and journalists in Bolivia, Chile, Serbia, Turkey, Uruguay and Venezuela for background information for his upcoming political/espionage novels set in Latin America and Central Europe. His research also led him to witness the 2009 Honduran coup d'état firsthand, to interview former combatants in Nicaragua and visit the former Chernobyl Nuclear Power Plant in northern Ukraine.  Frieden also went to China and Vietnam to research another novel, and he recently published a photography book capturing his journey through North Korea, including Pyongyang, Kaesong and the Korean Demilitarized Zone. Frieden has also written about his globetrotting book research in Thrilleresque® Magazine.  In addition, his non-fiction works have appeared in numerous legal, technology and international business publications worldwide.

Bibliography

Novels
 Letter from Istanbul (announced for 12/2019) - 4th Jonathan Brooks Series, Down & Out Books/Avendia Publ.  
 The Pyongyang Option (2019) - 3rd Jonathan Brooks Series, Down & Out Books/Avendia Publ.    
 The Serpent's Game (2013) - 2nd Jonathan Brooks Series, Down & Out Books/Avendia Publ. 
 Tranquility Denied (2007) - 1st Jonathan Brooks Series, Down & Out Books/Avendia Publ. 
 Canvas Sunsets Never Fade (2004), Avendia Publ.

Anthologies and Short Stories
 (Oct. 2014) "The Rendezvous", Down, Out and Dead, D&O Books 
 (Sep. 2008) "Atonement", SIN: A Deadly Anthology, Avendia Publ.

Photography Books
 North Korea: A Photographic Journey through the Hermit Kingdom (2011), Avendia Publ.

References 

A.C. Frieden Novels - Official Website
A.C. Frieden Amazon Author Page

1966 births
Living people
People from Dakar
Swiss writers
American spy fiction writers
American male novelists
Brazilian American
Swiss American